Alastair Caleb Storie (born 25 July 1965) is a former Scottish cricketer who has played first-class and List A cricket for Scotland and for several teams in England and South Africa.

A right-handed batsman, Storie played cricket in England with both Warwickshire and Northamptonshire as well as a season in South Africa with Free State. In total, he played 55 first class and 34 List A matches. He was the first Northamptonshire batsman to score a century on first-class debut. He also scored a century in his final first-class appearance (for Scotland). In 1988, Storie took 5 catches in an innings while playing for Warwickshire against Leicestershire at Edgbaston.

After his professional cricket career Alastair Storie gained a BA in English & Sociology and taught English for 12 years. In 2012 he qualified as a Chartered Sport & Exercise Psychologist an worked as a consultant in private practice until 2022. Between 2008 and 2020 he also held teaching positions at various universities (Heriot-Watt, Edinburgh, Abertay, and Stirling). During his time as a psychologist he gained qualifications in both Counselling and Mindfulness, and in 2022 he retired from sport to focus on these aspects.

References

1965 births
Living people
Scottish cricketers
Northamptonshire cricketers
Warwickshire cricketers
Free State cricketers
Sportspeople from Bishopbriggs
Oxford University cricketers
Cumberland cricketers
Buckinghamshire cricketers
Academics of the University of Edinburgh
Alumni of Keble College, Oxford
British Universities cricketers